Émile Zuccarelli (born 4 August 1940 in Bastia, Upper Corsica) is a French politician from Corsica. He serves as honorary President of the Radical Party of the Left and is a former mayor of Bastia. Before his defeat in the 2007 French legislative election, he was deputy for Upper Corsica.

In the 2004 French regional elections, Zuccarelli led a PRG list in Corsica and came out on top of all of the left-wing's lists. But the lack of dialog between him and another PRG list, led by his rival Paul Giacobbi, prevented him from winning.

Unlike his own political party, Zuccarelli called for a "NO" vote in the 2005 referendum on the Treaty establishing a Constitution for Europe.

Political career

Governmental functions

Minister of Public Service, State Reform and Decentralization : 1997–2000.
Minister of Posts and Telecommunications : 1992–1993.

Electoral mandates

National Assembly

Member of the National Assembly of France for Upper Corsica: 1986–1992 (Became minister in 1992) / 1993–1997 (Became minister in 1997) / 2000–2007. Elected in 1986, reelected in 1988, 1993, 1997, 2000, 2002.

Corsican Territorial Collectivity

Member of the Corsican Assembly : 1998–2002 (Resignation) / March–December 2004 (Resignation). Reelected in 2004.

Municipal Council

Mayor of Bastia : 1989–1997 (Resignation) / Since 2000.
Deputy-mayor of Bastia : 1997–2000.
Municipal councillor of Bastia : Since 1989.

Agglomeration community Council

President of the Agglomeration community of Bastia : Since 2002.
Member of the Agglomeration community of Bastia : Since 2002.

Political function

President of the Radical Party of the Left: 1989–1992.

References

1940 births
Living people
People from Bastia
Corsican politicians
Radical Party of the Left politicians
Politicians of the French Fifth Republic
French Ministers of Civil Service
French Ministers of Posts, Telegraphs, and Telephones
Mayors of Bastia
Deputies of the 12th National Assembly of the French Fifth Republic